Tricholoma fulvimarginatum is a mushroom of the agaric genus Tricholoma. Described as new to science in 1986, it is found in eastern North America.

See also
List of North American Tricholoma
List of Tricholoma species

References

fulvimarginatum
Fungi described in 1986
Fungi of North America